Three ships of the Royal Navy have borne the name HMS Moorhen, after the moorhen, a water bird:

 was a  composite screw gunboat launched in 1875 and sold in 1888.
She was renamed HMS Cockatrice in 1881, and HMS Moorhen in 1896. She was sold in 1899.
 was a river gunboat launched in 1901 and sold in 1933.

Royal Navy ship names